The 1185 East Midlands earthquake happened in England. It is the first earthquake in England for which there are reliable reports indicating damage. The moment magnitude of the shock was estimated to be above 5.0 and its intensity was placed at VII (Damaging) on the European macroseismic scale.

Earthquake
The earthquake of 15 April 1185 in the region of East Midlands was one of the largest and most damaging earthquakes the British Isles had ever encountered. The magnitude has been estimated at around 5 . Some think the epicentre of the earthquake was close to  Nottingham in East Midlands. The epicentre has also been suggested to be in or around Lincolnshire. However, it could possibly be anywhere from Dogger Bank to the East Midlands. Some references talk of the earthquake happening somewhere offshore in the North Sea east of northern England; its effects may have been felt as far away as Norway.

The historian Matthew Paris did not report it as being felt in London. His history records show that the first major earthquake in England since 1133 was the one of 13 February 1247.

Damage
There are reports of complete villages being totally demolished, including the villages of Raleigh and Danethorpe.  The hamlet of Grimston, now referred to as Wellow, may also have suffered damage, but that is debatable as the land was used for expansion of Rufford Abbey, and there is confusion as to what actually happened to the small hamlet.

Masonry houses were knocked down completely, which indicates an intensity of more than VII EMS at certain locations. Ralph of Diceto reported in writings done in London that it struck in northern England and that "in some places buildings were destroyed". There are also reports that stones were split ("petrae enim scissae sunt"); stone houses were knocked down; and that parts of Lincoln Cathedral were brought down. The damage to Lincoln cathedral has been a controversial issue because it cannot be determined to what extent the earthquake damaged it and what parts fell on their own due to poor construction. The city of Lincoln was reported to have been damaged by the earthquake.

See also
List of earthquakes in the United Kingdom
List of historical earthquakes

References

Notes

Citations

Bibliography

Further reading
Annales monasterii de Waverleia (A.D. 1-1291), p. 243 in Annales Monastici Vol. II / ed. Henry Richards Luard Rerum  Britannicarum medii aevi scriptores ; 36.) (London : Longman, Green, Longman, Roberts, and Green, 1865)
Annales monasterii de Bermundeseia (A.D. 1042-1432), p. 446 in Annales Monastici Vol. III / ed. Henry Richards Luard. (Rerum  Britannicarum medii aevi scriptores ; 36.) (London : Longman, Green, Longman, Roberts, and Green, 1866)
Annales prioratus de Wigornia (A.D. 1-1377), p. 385, in Annales Monastici Vol. IV / ed. Henry Richards Luard. (Rerum  Britannicarum medii aevi scriptores ; 36.) (London : Longman, Green, Longman, Roberts, and Green, 1869)
Memoriale Fratis  Walteris de Coventria, Pars  secunda: Annales Angliae, p. 336, in Annales Monastici Vol. III / ed. Henry Richards Luard (Rerum  Britannicarum medii aevi scriptores ; 36.) (London : Longman, Green, Longman, Roberts, and Green, 1864-1869)
Annales Prioratus de Dunstaplia (A.D. 1 -1297), p. 23, in Annales Monastici Vol. III / ed. Henry Richards Luard. (Rerum  Britannicarum medii aevi scriptores ; 36.) (London : Longman, Green, Longman, Roberts, and Green, 1866)

Geology of Great Britain
12th century in England
1185
12th-century earthquakes
1185 in England
East Midlands